Saint Raphael often refers to Saint Raphael the Archangel.

Saint Raphael or Saint-Raphaël may also refer to:

Religion
Raphael of Brooklyn (1860–1915), saint in the Christian Orthodox tradition

Places

 Saint-Raphaël, Quebec, a village in the Bellechasse Regional County Municipality, Quebec, Canada
 Saint-Raphaël-sur-Mer, part of Ste-Marie-St-Raphaël, on Lamèque Island, New Brunswick, Canada
 Saint-Raphaël, Dordogne, a community in the Dordogne département of France
 Saint-Raphaël, Var, a community in the Var département of France
 Saint-Raphaël Arrondissement, an arrondissement in Nord department, Haiti
 Saint-Raphaël, Haiti, a commune in Nord department, Haiti
 St Raphael's Estate, London, UK

Church establishments

 Saint Raphael's Cathedral, Madison, Wisconsin, a Catholic parish in Madison, Wisconsin, USA
 Saint Raphael Catholic Church (Koloa, Hawaii), a Catholic parish in Hawaii, USA
 St. Raphael's Cathedral (Dubuque, Iowa), a Catholic parish in Iowa, USA
 St. Raphael the Archangel Catholic Church, a Catholic church and school in Raleigh, North Carolina, USA
 Church of St. Raphael the Archangel, Vilnius, a Catholic church in Vilnius, Lithuania

Institutions

 Collège Saint-Raphaël, now Collège de Montréal, a secondary school in Montreal, Quebec, Canada
 St. Raphael Academy, a Catholic secondary school in Pawtucket, Rhode Island, USA
 Hospital of Saint Raphael, a hospital in New Haven, Connecticut, USA
 Saint Raphael Hospital, former hospital, housed in the Thompson-Fasbender House, Hastings, Minnesota, USA
 Saint Raphael the Archangel Catholic School, a K-8 private school in Raleigh, North Carolina, USA

 Campus Saint-Raphael, UZ Leuven, part of the academic hospital

Transport
 St. Raphael (aircraft) - aircraft used for a transatlantic crossing attempt in 1927

Sport
 Saint-Raphaël (cycling team), a French cycling team that existed from 1954 to 1964, sponsored by the Saint-Raphaël apéritif drink

Food and drink
, a French apéritif brand

See also 
 Raphael (disambiguation)
 San Rafael (disambiguation)